João Rodrigues de Castelo Branco, better known as Amato Lusitano and Amatus Lusitanus (1511–1568), was a notable Portuguese Jewish physician of the 16th century. He is sometimes is said to have discovered the valves in the azygos vein.

Life

Lusitano was born in 1511 in Castelo Branco, Portugal. He was a descendant of a Marrano family called Chabib (= Amatus, "beloved" in Latin), and was brought up in the Jewish faith. After having graduated with honors as M.D. from the University of Salamanca, he was unable to return Portugal for fear of the Inquisition. He went to Antwerp for a time and then traveled through the Netherlands and France, finally settling in Italy. His reputation as one of the most skillful physicians of his time preceded him there, and during his short sojourn at Venice, where he came in contact with the physician and philosopher Jacob Mantino, he attended the niece of Pope Julius III and other distinguished personages.

In the 1540s Amatus was in Ferrara, where Giambattista Canano one of the leading anatomists of the time was performing numerous dissections. According to Amato they dissected twelve cadavers in a single year but it is unclear whether Amato was actively participating or only watching. He later reported Canano's finding of a valve at the beginning of the azygos vein which Canano had made on this occasion, and has for this reason sometimes mistakenly taken for the discoverer of the venous valves. During his sojourn in Ferrara, which lasted for six years, Amatus Lusitanus received an invitation from the King of Poland to move to that country, which he declined, preferring to settle in Ancona, where religious tolerance existed.

Meanwhile, his reputation grew higher and higher. Jacoba del Monte, sister of Pope Julius III, was one of his patients; and he prescribed also for Julius himself, to whose sick-bed he was later summoned.

With the accession of Paul IV, Amatus underwent all the sufferings which the Marranos of Ancona had to endure from this pope. He took refuge in Pesaro, leaving behind him all his possessions, including several manuscript works, the loss of which he greatly deplored. One of these manuscripts, however, the fifth part of his Centuriæ, was later restored to him and published. During his sojourn at Pesaro he received an invitation from the municipality of Ragusa, After staying for some months he left the city for Thessaloniki, which then had a large Jewish community and was part of the Ottoman Empire; there he openly professed the Jewish faith and finally died in 1568.

Work

Amato reported Canano's discovery of a valve at the beginning of the azygos vein, and due to this report has by some scholars wrongly been praised as the discoverer of the venous valves or indeed the blood circulation. In the Centuria I, paragraph (Curatio) 513, he described the function of this valve, which Canano - who had also discovered valves in other veins - demonstrated in 1547 to some scholars from the University of Ferrara. Amato's account is profoundly flawed, however, suggesting that he had the description from hearsay and was not present in person. He claimed that if air was blown into the lower part of the azygos the vena cava would not be inflated because the valve was in the way. The valve works exactly the other way round, however. According to modern understanding, it prevents a reflux of blood from the vena cava into the vena azygos. Air would therefore quite easily pass from the vena azygos to the vena cava but not in the opposite direction. Amatus' account was widely ridiculed and the study of venous valves was set back several years.

Amatus enriched medical literature with several valuable works which for a long time enjoyed the highest reputation. Among these the most important was his Centuriæ, in which he published accounts of his cases and their treatment. This work, in seven volumes, entitled Curationum Medicinalium Centuriæ Septem, passed through a number of editions (Florence, 1551; Venice, 1552, 1557, 1560, 1653; Basel, 1556; Leyden, 1560, 1570; Paris, 1620; Bordeaux, 1620; Barcelona, 1628). His other works were: Index Dioscoridis (1536); Enegemata in Duos Priores Dioscoridis de Arte Medica Libros (Antwerp, 1536); In Dioscorides de Medica materia Librum quinque enarrationis (1556); Commentatio de Introitu Medici ad Ægrotantem, (Venice, 1557); De Crisi et Diebus Decretoriis, (Venice, 1557); In Dioscoridis Anazarbei de Medica Materia Libros Quinque, (Venice, 1557; Leyden, 1558); Enarrationes Eruditissimæ, (Venice, 1553); La Historia de Eutropio (Eutropius translated into Spanish); commentary on the first book of Avicenna's Canon, which, as he relates in the preface to the seventh Centuria, he lost among his possessions at Ancona.

References
Amatus Lusitanus discovered valves in veins and arteries; by David Hashavit, citation: "There's a reasonable basis to assume that it was Dr. Amatus who first discovered the "Blood circulation" phenomena."
 Michael Stolberg: Gabrielle Falloppia 1522/23-1562. The life and work of a Renaissance anatomist. London and New York: Routledge 2022 (copyright 2023), 55-57.
 Harry Friedenwald: Amatus Lusitanus. In: Bulletin of the Institute of the History of Medicine, The Johns Hopkins University, vol. 5, no. 7, July 1937, p. 603-653
Wolf, Johann Christoph, Bibliotheca Hebræa i. 200
Carmoly, Eliakim, in Revue Orientale, ii. 200
David, Ernest, in Archives Israélites, 1880
Allg. Zeit. des Jud. 1880, pp. 668, 684, 749
Steinschneider, Moritz, Die Hebräischen Übersetzungen p. 686;
Hermann Vogelstein and Paul Rieger, Geschichte der Juden in Rom, ii. 256

External links

 Short biography

Notes

1511 births
1568 deaths
People from Castelo Branco, Portugal
16th-century Portuguese physicians
16th-century Jewish physicians
16th-century Italian physicians
16th-century Latin-language writers
Portuguese Renaissance writers
Portuguese anatomists
Jewish physicians
Jewish biologists
University of Salamanca alumni
University of Ferrara alumni
16th-century Portuguese Jews
16th-century Italian Jews
Sephardi Jews from the Ottoman Empire
Italian Sephardi Jews
Italian people of Portuguese descent
Greek people of Portuguese descent
Portuguese emigrants to the Ottoman Empire
Medieval Jewish physicians of Portugal